The Great Destroyer is the seventh studio album by American indie rock band Low. It was released on January 25, 2005, as their first recording on Sub Pop Records.

"California", a song about Sparhawk's mother, was released as the album's first single, backed with a demo of "Cue the Strings". A remix EP of "Monkey", entitled "Tonight the Monkeys Die", soon followed. Music videos were created for both.

The title of the album (as well as the song "Silver Rider") is taken from the story within the album art.

Critical reception

 The site named it the 46th-best reviewed album of 2005.

Track listing
All songs written by Mimi Parker, Zak Sally, and Alan Sparhawk
"Monkey" – 4:19
"California" – 3:23
"Everybody's Song" – 3:55
"Silver Rider" – 5:03
"Just Stand Back" – 3:04
"On the Edge Of" – 3:49
"Cue the Strings" – 3:30
"Step" – 3:18
"When I Go Deaf" – 4:41
"Broadway (So Many People)" – 7:14
"Pissing" – 5:08
"Death of a Salesman" – 2:28
"Walk into the Sea" – 2:56

Personnel
Low
Mimi Parker – percussion, vocals, production, mixing
Zak Sally – bass guitar, production, mixing, painting, illustrations
Alan Sparhawk – guitar, vocals, production, mixing

Additional personnel
Gerry Beckley – backing vocals on "Everybody's Song"
Greg Calbi – mastering at Sterling Sound
Dave Fridmann – production, mixing, keyboards on "California", "Everybody's Song", "Step", and "Broadway (So Many People)"
Tom Herbers – engineering
Jeff Kleinsmith – layout
Hollis Mae Sparhawk – vocals on "Step", photography

Charts

References

External links

2005 albums
Albums produced by Dave Fridmann
Kranky albums
Low (band) albums
Sub Pop albums
Albums recorded at Tarbox Road Studios